Henri François Xavier de Belsunce de Castelmoron (3 December 1671 at the Château de la Force, in Périgord – 4 June 1755 in Marseilles) was a French Jesuit who became Bishop of Marseille. Belsunce is remembered for his tireless efforts to relieve the suffering during the Great Plague of Marseille of 1720-21.

Early life
He was the second son of Armand de Belsunce, Marquis de Castelmoron, and his wife Anne de Caumont de Lausun. His maternal uncle was courtier and soldier Antoine Nompar de Caumont, Duke of Lauzun. His Huguenot parents thought it more advantageous for him to be raised a Catholic.

Henri studied classics in Paris at the College de Clermont or the Lycée Louis-le-Grand and converted to Catholicism at about the age of fifteen. He then entered the Society of Jesus. In 1699 he left the Society for reasons of health and became Vicar-General of Agen.

The Vie de Suzanne de Foix, a biography of his aunt, was written by him and published while at Agen, 1709. That same year he was made Bishop of Marseille.

Bishop
As bishop, Belsunce reorganized the lay confraternities, promoted pilgrimages, and led processions. For him, religion was a community affair. In April 1718, he established the Association of Perpetual Adoration of the Sacred Heart in Marseilles; its statutes were drafted by Visitation nun (later Venerable) Anne-Madeleine Remuzat, whom the bishop had received into the congregation as a novice.

The plague
The charity he displayed during the Great Plague of Marseille of 1720 and 1721 which killed 100,000 people in Marseille, made his name a household word and won for him the title of "Good Bishop". When the plague broke out a large fleet was taking the Princess of Orléans to Italy where she was to marry the Duke of Modena. The suite of the princess took to flight, and with them all the notables of the city, but Bishop Belsunce remained with a few friends, and together they battled against the plague, till they conquered it.

The bishop went three times on foot to the chapel at Notre-Dame de la Garde on September 28, December 8, 1720; and August 13, 1721 to bless the inhabitants of the city.
In the midst of the plague, on 22 October 1720, at the suggestion of Soeur Anne-Madeleine,  Mgr de Belsunce established a feast in honour of the Sacred Heart. On 1 November he solemnly consecrated the city and the Diocese to the Sacred Heart of Jesus.

In his address to the Assembly of the Clergy in 1725, Belsunce stated that more than 250 priests and religious perished at that time. But he was the soul of the rescuers and the praises bestowed on him by Alexander Pope and Charles Hubert Millevoye (Essay on Man and Belsunce ou la peste de Marseille)
were deserved.

The King of France offered him, by way of recognition, the See of Laon to which was attached the first ecclesiastical peerage of the realm and afterwards the metropolitan See of Bordeaux. Belsunce refused both and contented himself with accepting the pallium sent him by Pope Clement XII.

Nicolas-André Monsiau painted The Devotion of Monsignor de Belsunce during the plague of 1720 (1819). François Gérard painted Monsignor of Belsunce during the plague of Marseille The eveque Henri Francois Xavier de Belsunce-Castelmoron (Belsunce Castelmoron) (1671-1755) rescuing the sick during the plague epidemic of 1720 (1834).

There is a bronze statue of Belsunce in the square outside the Cathédrale Sainte-Marie-Majeure de Marseille commemorating his work during the plague. During the occupation of World War II, knowing that the Germans were looking for non-ferrous metals, resistance fighters hid the 2800 kg of bronze of the statue in a warehouse on Boulevard de Louvain. The Grand Cours was renamed the Cours Belsunce.

He is mentioned by Albert Camus in the novel The Plague, in the second sermon of Father Paneloux.

Jansenism
During his incumbency Belsunce fought against Jansenism. He attended, 1727, the Synod of Embrun where Jean Soanen was condemned. He opposed with all his power Colbert of Pamiers. In spite of the protest of the Parliament of Aix-en-Provence, he instructed his priests to refuse absolution to the appellants against the Bull Unigenitus. Nearly all his pastoral instructions are against Jansenism.

Works

Besides the Vie de Suzanne de Foix (Agen, 1709), and his pastoral instructions, we have from his pen Le combat chrétien translated from Augustine of Hippo's De Agone Christiano and L'art de bien mourir translated from Bellarmine's De Arte Bene Moriendi, also Antiquités de l'Eglise de Marseille (Marseilles, 1747–51). All these writings were published by Jauffret under the title of Oeuvres de Belsunce (Metz, 1822).

References

External links
 "The eveque Henri Francois Xavier de Belsunce-Castelmoron (Belsunce Castelmoron) (1671-1755) rescuing the sick during the plague epidemic of 1720". Gérard, 1834

1671 births
1755 deaths
18th-century French Jesuits
Bishops of Marseille
18th-century French Roman Catholic bishops